Military awards and decorations are distinctions given as a mark of honor for military heroism, meritorious or outstanding service or achievement. A decoration is often a medal consisting of a ribbon and a medallion.

Civil decorations awarded to military personnel should not be considered military decorations, although some orders of chivalry have civil and military divisions. Decorations received by police and fire brigade personnel may sometimes be considered alongside military decorations, on which they may be modelled, although they are strictly not military awards.

History

Decorations have been known since ancient times. The Egyptian Old Kingdom had the Order of the Golden Collar while the New Kingdom awarded the Order of the Golden Fly. Celts and Romans wore a torc or received other military decorations such as the hasta pura, a spear without a tip. Dayaks wore and still wear tattoos, etc. Necklaces and bracelets were given during the early Middle Ages, evolving into large, richly jewelled necklaces, often with a pendant (commonly a medal) attached.

The oldest military decorations still in use is Sweden's För tapperhet i fält ("For Valour in the Field") and För tapperhet till sjöss ("For Valour at Sea") awarded to officers and soldiers of the Swedish Armed Forces who have—as the medal names suggest—shown valour in the field or at sea in wartime. The medal was instituted by Swedish king Gustav III on 28 May 1789, during his war against Russia. Whilst technically it is still active, it is for practical purposes inactive, not having been awarded since 1915. The next oldest is the Austro-Hungarian Tapferkeits Medaille Honour Medal for Bravery 1789–1792. This medal was instituted on 19 July 1789, by the Emperor Joseph II. Another of the oldest military decorations still in use is Poland's War Order of Virtuti Militari (Latin for "For Military Valour"). It was first awarded in 1792.

Forgery 
Medals have been forged by many people to make the medal appear more valuable or to make one look like a more decorated soldier. Medal forgeries can include: adding bars, engraving a famous soldier's name on it or creating a whole new medal. Medal forgery is illegal in most countries and can be punishable by imprisonment.

Contemporary use
Today military decorations include:

Order of merit;
Bravery awards, in the form of a cross, star or medal on a ribbon;
Distinguished service awards, in the form of a cross, star or medal on a ribbon;
Campaign medals worn on a ribbon;
Service medals worn on a ribbon;
Awards for entire units, in the form of Battle honours, Campaign streamers, Fourragères, or unit citations.

In most NATO militaries, only the service ribbons are normally worn on everyday occasions (as opposed to the actual medals).

See also 
List of military decorations
List of highest military decorations
Civil decoration
State decoration
Neck decoration
Commonwealth Realms orders and decorations
Awards and decorations of the United States military
Awards and decorations of the Russian Federation
Awards and decorations of the Soviet Union
Israeli Military decorations
Orders, decorations, and medals of Spain
Orders, decorations and medals of Belgium
Awards and decorations of the German Armed Forces
Orders, decorations, and medals of the United Kingdom
Medal inflation

References